Nugu Wildlife Sanctuary is situated north of Bandipur National Park in Mysore District of Karnataka, India. The northern part of Nugu WLS is occupied by the Nugu Reservoir. It serves as a home to many species of flora and fauna such as Dipterocarpus indicus, Calophyllum tomentosum, elephants, wild pigs, spotted deer, leopards, jungle cats, etc. This wildlife sanctuary serves as a great tourist attraction, especially in the months of October to April.

According to animal activists, Nugu is a vulnerable area as far as human–elephant conflicts are concerned.

Location 
The wildlife sanctuary is also surrounded by Nugu Dam, two seasonal lakes, and three water tanks to provide water resources in the sanctuary.

Eco-sensitive zone 
Nugu Wildlife Sanctuary has been declared as an eco-sensitive zone by the Ministry of Environment, Forests and Climate Change, because of the number of commercial tourism ventures in the sanctuary. This was also done in order to emphasize the density of elephant populations and to conserve them.

References 

Wildlife sanctuaries in Karnataka